Capital International Airport  is the primary international airport serving the new capital of Egypt, which is yet to be given a name.

The airport was inaugurated by the president of Egypt, Abdel Fattah el-Sisi and was opened by the Egyptian Airports Company on 9 July 2019 for a one-month trial period (300 hourly passengers), and with commercial operations commencing in 2020. The main contractor of the airport is Hassan Allam Holding, it is operated by the Egyptian Airports Company and owned by the Egyptian Armed Forces.

Facilities 
The airport includes a passenger terminal with a current capacity of 300 passengers per hour, eight parking spaces for aircraft, 45 service and administrative buildings, an air control tower and a  runway suitable for receiving large aircraft, equipped with lighting and automatic landing systems.

See also 

 List of airports in Egypt
 Transport in Egypt
Cairo International Airport
Sphinx International Airport
New Administrative Capital of Egypt

References 

Airports in Egypt
Buildings and structures in Cairo Governorate
2019 establishments in Egypt
Airports established in 2019
21st-century architecture in Egypt